Bud Moore may refer to:
 Bud Moore (American football) (born 1939), American football player and coach
 Bud Moore (NASCAR owner) (1925–2017), American NASCAR owner
 Bud Moore (racing driver) (1941–2017), American NASCAR driver

See also
Bud Moore Engineering, the NASCAR owner's team